"Automatic Flowers" is a song by Canadian alternative rock group Our Lady Peace. It was released in July 1997 as the third single from their second studio album, Clumsy.

Background and writing
In writing the song, Raine Maida began by thinking about a woman who lived alone in her apartment. The woman has little going on in her life, and the apartment is dingy, without much of a view. She has boxes from her childhood, and one day she takes out a pop-up book and opens it to a garden with pop-up flowers. Whenever she wants to cheer herself up, she opens the book. Maida puts only traces of the entire history in the lyrics.

Music video
For the first time, Our Lady Peace self-directed their music video for this song. The video consists of the band playing in a dimly lit room (a rehearsal space in Toronto). The video reached the #1 spot on the Muchmusic countdown on October 15, 1997. In 1998 it was ranked #47 for Muchmusic's favourite videos of all time.

Chart performance

References

External links

1997 singles
Our Lady Peace songs
Songs written by Raine Maida
1996 songs
Columbia Records singles
Songs written by Arnold Lanni